The Stade municipal de Nouadhibou, or Municipal Stadium in english, is a multi-purpose stadium in Nouadhibou, Mauritania. It is used mostly for football matches. The capacity has been 10,300 since the most recent renovation. The stadium is used by the FC Nouadhibou.

History
The stadium has been renovated in 2020 in order to prepare the 2021 Africa U-20 Cup of Nations hosted by Mauritania. its capacity goes from 1.000 to 10.300 people.

References

External links
Studium profile – Soccerway.com

Football venues in Mauritania
Sports venues in Mauritania
Mauritania
Multi-purpose stadiums in Mauritania
Sport in Nouadhibou